is a 1994 Japanese film directed by Takayoshi Watanabe.

Cast
 Kenichi Hagiwara : Sotaro
 Shigeru Muroi : Sizuko
 Nobuo Yana : Uoharu
 Tomoko Yamaguchi : Satoko
 Etsushi Toyokawa : Sugimoto
 Hidetoshi Nishijima : Koichi

Reception
19th Hochi Film Awards 
 Won: Best Actor - Kenichi Hagiwara
 Won: Best Supporting Actress - Shigeru Muroi 
 Won: Best Newcomer - Tomoko Yamaguchi

References

External links
 

1994 films
Films directed by Takayoshi Watanabe
Japanese ghost films
1990s Japanese films